Porichoi is a 2013 Bengali Language drama film written & directed by Ms. Rupali Guha. This film was Joey Debroy's debut in Bengali film industry.

Its theatrical release was on 21 July 2013.

The film is a story of father-daughter relationship and a handsome young boy who helps them to rediscover their relationship. Played by Prosenjit Chatterjee, Joey Debroy and Indrani Chakraborty, the story highlights Bengali-speaking Asians living in the UK who finds various means to stay connected with their homeland, especially during adversities.

Joey Debroy is making his debut in Bengali film industry as a hero.

Rupali is the daughter of film director Basu Chatterjee, and makes her directorial debut in Bengal with this film.

Plot

Porichoi is Anupam, Rimi and Fahim's story as the two get re-introduced to each other after twelve years and the third one helps them rediscover their father-daughter relationship. Anupam had left for UK leaving Rimi and her mother behind.  Rimi takes off to the UK to reconnect with her estranged father. She comes in terms with her father's lifestyle in UK. Rimi also befriends a British-Bangladeshi boy Fahim played by Joey Debroy.  The movie focuses on Rimi, Anupam and Fahim's world and as it gets disintegrated, they are all forced to look within themselves.
The international cast also includes renowned British - Bangladeshi actor Ifte Amed in a dynamic negative role.

Cast
 Prosenjit Chatterjee as Anupam
Joey Debroy as Fahim
 Mishti as Rimi 
 Heidi Mumford as Laurie				
 Ferdous Ahmed as Salim
 Ifte Amed as Proshonto Choudhury
 Indrani Chakraborty

Production
The film has been shot in UK and Kolkata.

References

2013 films
Bengali-language Indian films
British Indian films
British Bangladeshi films
Films set in Kolkata
Films set in England
Films shot in Kolkata
Films shot in England
Indian diaspora in the United Kingdom
2010s Bengali-language films
2013 directorial debut films